Pryamukhino is a Russian village in the Kuvshinovsky District of the Tver Oblast.

Geography
Pryamukhino is located on the Osuga River, which flows towards the provincial capital of Tver.

History
In 1779, the estate of Pryamukhino was acquired by Mikhail Vasilyevich Bakunin, a minor member of the Russian nobility who had risen through the Table of Ranks to become a State Councillor for Catherine the Great. Lacking in any further political ambition, Bakunin retired to Pryamukhino, where he raised three sons and five daughters. In 1803, Mikhail Vasilyevich Bakunin died, leaving the estate under the management of his third son, Alexander Bakunin. 

Mikhail Bakunin was born there.

References

Bibliography 
 

Rural localities in Kuvshinovsky District